Adrachti is a rock in the Meteora rock formation complex of Thessaly, Greece.

Due to its long, thin shape, it is sometimes called the "Spindle". In clockwise order, starting from the north, it is surrounded by Sourloti, Modi, Alysos, Agia, and Pyxari rocks.

Access
A trail leads to Adrachti from the village of Kastraki. The trail starts off as a stairway with wooden steps and leads up to the Cell of Constantius (Κελί του Κωνστάντιου), and then continues further uphills directly to the base of Adrachti.

References

Rocks of Meteora